"The Lady Daffodilia" is a children's short story written by Evelyn Sharp and published in 1900 by John Lane. Along with other works by Evelyn Sharp, it was published in a book entitled The Other Side Of The Sun.

Plot

Lady Daffodilia is a very tall 12-year-old girl because all she does is grow. She is playmates with Prince Brilliant. Prince Brilliant is very brilliant and wise but compared to Lady Daffodilia is quite short. Lady Daffodilia teases Prince Brilliant about his height. This upsets him and he decides to set out on a journey and vowing not to return until he has grown as tall as her.

Lady Daffodilia is distressed by the Prince’s absence as she is lonely without anyone to play with or tease. She decides to invest all of her time in becoming as brilliant as Prince Brilliant, but is entirely unsuccessful. An ambiguous group termed “the people” “came and clapped her into prison” as they believed that she was at fault for the Prince’s absence. The prison is an old and lonely castle where Lady Daffodilia occupies her time becoming an excellent gardener.

The prince meets a daddy-longlegs who tells him that with great patience, he will be able to grow long legs. The daddy-longlegs instructs Prince Brilliant to jump into a hedge, where he enters into the world of dreams. Prince Brilliant spends seven years playing in the dream world before the daddy-longlegs returns to tell him that he should go back into the real world.

Prince Brilliant reunites with Lady Daffodilia, who is now a “dainty, winsome little lady,” and she is in awe at how tall he has become. Lady Daffodilia was unable to grow any smarter, but Prince Brilliant does not think that that  matters, as she is “sweet and merry and charming.”

Character descriptions

Queen-mother: Mother of Prince Brilliant; reprimands her son’s manners towards Lady Daffodilia.

Countess: advises Lady Daffodilia’s manners towards Prince Brilliant.

Daddy-longlegs: tells Prince Brilliant how to grow his legs longer.

Lady Daffodilia: 12 years old; tall; idle; careless; thoughtless; fair; loves to tease Prince Brilliant about being short; desires to be as smart as Prince Brilliant once he goes away; unsuccessful in her endeavor; becomes a grand gardener.

Prince Brilliant: short; intellectual; well-read; always means what he says; straightforward; desires to be as tall as lady Daffodilia; grows tall in dream-land and returns happily to Lady Daffodilia.

Author bio

Evelyn Sharp was an author and a suffragist in Britain. She was born in 1869 and died in 1955. In her adolescence, she went to the boarding school Strathallan House School, and later she was sent to Paris where she attended finishing school. She was known for her children’s literature and activism in two major women’s suffrage societies. Throughout her career as a writer, she wrote for the Pall Mall Gazette, Atalanta, Daily Chronicle, and the Manchester Guardian.

References

External links 

The Other Side of the Sun by Evelyn Sharp. Google Books.'

Children's short stories
1900 short stories